James Coombes (born 8 October 1956 in Newport, Monmouthshire) is a British film, television and theatre actor.
He trained as an actor at the Birmingham School of Speech and Drama from 1975 to 1978.

He is best known for his roles as Pierre Challon during the final series of the BBC drama Howards' Way, and Grendel in HTV's Robin of Sherwood. He also donned the famous black polo top as the iconic Milk Tray Man in the eighties' TV adverts. He appeared as Paroli in the 1984 Doctor Who serial Warriors of the Deep and provided the voice of the Krargs in the lost episode Shada, written by Douglas Adams. He has appeared in many films including Murder with Mirrors co-starring with Bette Davis and Helen Hayes, and played Richard Gere's son, Amnon, in the Bible epic, King David. He also played Sir Lancelot in the Disney film, A Knight in Camelot with Whoopi Goldberg. He appeared in Monarch, with fellow Doctor Who actors T. P. McKenna and Jean Marsh.

Coombes has worked extensively in the theatre including seasons at Chichester Festival, Pitlochry Festival, Bristol Old Vic, London Young Vic, The Arts Theatre, London, Ludlow Festival, Coventry, Southampton Nuffield and Birmingham Rep.

Other credits include: Minder on the Orient Express, The Country Diary of an Edwardian Lady, Capital City, US mini series Napoleon and Josephine, Boon, The Kenny Everett Television Show, Drop the Dead Donkey, Saracen, Heartbeat, Bugs, Holby City, Starhunter, The Bill, My Family and Dinosapien.  He appeared as Paul Deroulard in "The Chocolate Box" episode of Agatha Christie's Poirot, and was Gennaro Lucca in the Jeremy Brett Memoirs of Sherlock Holmes adventure, "The Red Circle" . He recently appeared in a UK and Ireland tour of Dirty Dancing, playing Dr. Jake Houseman following runs at the Piccadilly Theatre, and the Phoenix Theatre, London. He currently appears in Knightfall which started broadcasting in December 2017 on History Channel. In January 2018, he directed Hayfever by Noel Coward at ArtsEd London.

As well as acting, Coombes regularly tutors at the Academy of Creative Training in Brighton and guest directs at ArtsEd School of Musical Theatre, London. He has recently attained a BA Hons in performance studies from Arts Educational, London, in conjunction with City University. He is a trustee for Denville Hall the care home for members of the theatrical profession in Northwood, London. http://www.denvillehall.org.uk/

In 1989, he married Cathy Finlay, daughter of actor Frank Finlay CBE. They have three children, Josh (drummer in rock band TIGRESS), Charlotte and Benedict.

References

External links
 

Welsh male television actors
Living people
People from Newport, Wales
1956 births